Splatter may refer to:

 Blood splatter
 Spectral splatter, radio electronics and acoustics
 Splatter cone, a type of volcano
 Splatter guard
 Splatter painting

Entertainment
 Splatter film, horror film genre with excessive bloody gore
 Splatter Farm (1986)
 Splatter Beach (2006)
 Splatter Theatre, comedy play
 Splatters, a Buckethead album

See also
 
 
 Splat (disambiguation)
 Spatter (disambiguation)
 Spray (disambiguation)